Paul Adams (born 4 June 1992) is an Australian sports shooter. He competed in the men's skeet event at the 2016 Summer Olympics and at the 2018 Commonwealth Games. Adams represented Australia at the 2020 Summer Olympics in Tokyo, Japan. He competed in the men's skeet event but did not score sufficient points to advance past qualification.

Personal life
On 13 October 2018, Adams joined the Royal Australian Navy Reserve as a Nursing Officer.

References

External links
 

1992 births
Living people
Australian male sport shooters
Olympic shooters of Australia
Shooters at the 2016 Summer Olympics
Shooters at the 2020 Summer Olympics
21st-century Australian people